Zarina Wahab is an Indian actress who predominantly worked in Hindi and Malayalam films. Known for critically acclaimed roles in Chitchor and Gopal Krishna  in Hindi and Malayalam cinema with films like Madanolsavam, Chamaram, Palangal and Adaminte Makan Abu.

Early life
Wahab was born in Visakhapatnam, Andhra Pradesh into a Muslim family. She is fluent in her mother tongue Urdu, in addition to Telugu, Hindi and English. She was trained at Film and Television Institute of India (FTII), Pune. Wahab has three sisters and one brother.

Career
After receiving negative feedback about her appearance from film producer Raj Kapoor, Wahab worked on her appearance and attended film parties and events. She eventually got noticed and was cast in films. She was usually cast as the middle-class girl after her first leading role in Basu Chatterjee's Chit Chor (1976) in movies like Agar, Jazbaat, Sawan Ko Aane Do, and Raees Zada. She was nominated for a Filmfare Award in the Best Actress category for Gharonda (1977).  She has acted in many Malayalam, Telugu, Tamil, films. Wahab made a comeback to Malayalam films with Calendar, in 2009 and has continued to act in Malayalam movies. She is still remembered for her role in the critically acclaimed Adaminte Makan Abu. She also appeared in My Name Is Khan as the mother of Rizwan Khan (Shah Rukh Khan's character). Wahab currently plays older roles in television serials.

Personal life
Wahab met actor Aditya Pancholi on the sets of Kalank Ka Tika. They married in 1986 and have a daughter, Sana and a son, Sooraj. News of their turbulent marriage, her husband's temper and rumors of infidelity have been in the gossip columns. Wahab's daughter is an actress. Her son, Suraj, was arrested in June 2013, in connection with the death of Jiah Khan. He made his Bollywood debut with Sunil Shetty's daughter Athiya Shetty in 2015 in the movie Hero.

Filmography

Television

Television

 Ek Kiran Roshni Ki on DD National as Roshni's mother
 Zindagi...Ek Bhanwar on DD National as Sharda Baldev Singh
 Love Life & Screw Ups Season 2  as Honey
 Tanaav (2022)
 Taj: Divided by Blood (2023)

Awards and nominations

 The Global Indian Film And Television Honors for Best Actor In A Supporting Role – Female (2011) for My Name Is Khan
 Nominated–Filmfare Award for Best Actress (1977) for Gharonda
 Nominated–Screen Award for Best Supporting Actress (2011) for Rakht Charitra – I
Nominated–Stardust Award for Best Actress In An Ensemble Cast (2011) for My Name Is Khan
 Nominated–Stardust Award for Best Actress In An Ensemble Cast (2011) for Rakht Charitra – I

References

External links
 
 

Indian actresses
Actresses in Malayalam cinema
Living people
Actresses from Visakhapatnam
Film and Television Institute of India alumni
Indian television actresses
Actresses in Hindi cinema
Actresses in Tamil cinema
Actresses in Telugu cinema
Actresses in Kannada cinema
Actresses in Hindi television
20th-century Indian actresses
21st-century Indian actresses
Female models from Andhra Pradesh
Year of birth missing (living people)
Actors from Mumbai
Telugu actresses